Nicolae Andronic (born 13 May 1959) is a Moldovan jurist, and lawyer. He served as member of Parliament of Moldova between 1990 and 1998 and as Deputy Speaker of the Parliament of Moldova in 1994. He headed the extra-parliamentary Republican Popular Party from 2005 to 2015.

Early life 

Nicolae Andronic was born on May 13, 1959, in the village of Cotiujenii Mari, Soroca region, into a family of intellectuals.  In 1981, at the Faculty of Law of the State University of Moldova, he obtained the Ph.D. in law. He is married and has two children.

Professional activity 

In the years 1981-1986 working as probationer, investigator at Straseni district prosecutor’s office, senior investigator at prosecutor’s offices of Frunze, Soviet districts, Chisinau city. In 1986 he worked as a Senior expert at juridical section of the Office of the Presidium of the Supreme Soviet of the MSSR. In the years 1990 – 1992 working as a Senior consultant of the Republic of Moldova Parliament’s leadership. He is a Lawyer Since 2001 until now.

Political activity 
In 1989, he was the member of the commission for drafting law on languages in the Republic of Moldova. From  1990 to 1998 Nicolae Andronic was elected as  Member of the Parliament of the Republic of Moldova. In 1994, he was appointed Deputy Chairman of the Parliament.  From 1993 to 1994 he was   Chairman of the Commissions for Juridical and Law reform, which started the legal reforms in Moldova and member of the Commission on drafting the text of new Constitution. In 1999 he was Chairman of the Commission for territorial reform and decentralization of state power. On May 22nd, 1998 Nicolae Andronic was appointed Deputy Prime Minister, he held the function during Ion Ciubuc Cabinet II, and then from 1999 to 2000, he held the function of First Deputy Prime Minister in Ion Sturza Cabinet. From 2005 to 2015 he was the Chairman of the Republican Popular Party.

On April 13th, 2014 at a Republican Popular Party congress, Nicolae Andronic gave the party to Renato Usatîi, renaming it to "Our Party". However, two months later Ministry of Justice rejected these changes invoking irregularities in the procedure of convening congress.

On February 8th, 2015 took place the repeated 4th Congress of Republican Popular Party, during which all the previous actions were repeated and, party was renamed, was elected a new chairman of party (Renato Usatîi), and was changed the party statute and program, with a unanimous vote of all the 97 delegates attending at the congress.

Works 
Books
 Nicolae Andronic - „Opt ani în Parlament”
 Nicolae Andronic - „Suveranitatea de Stat a Republicii Moldova”
 Nicolae Andronic - „Cotiujenii Mari”

Decorations 
 Order of the Republic (Moldova) (2012)
 Order of Honour (Moldova) (2011)
 "Meritul Civic" Medal (1996)
 Church decorations for as sponsor of some sacred bays.

References

External links
 Cine au fost și ce fac deputații primului Parlament din R. Moldova (1990-1994)?  

1959 births
Living people
People from Șoldănești District
Moldovan MPs 1990–1994
Our Party (Moldova) politicians
Moldovan writers
Moldova State University alumni
Recipients of the Order of the Republic (Moldova)
Recipients of the Order of Honour (Moldova)
Romanian people of Moldovan descent